Kittlitz may refer to:

Places
Kittlitz, Lauenburg, a municipality in the district of Lauenburg, Schleswig-Holstein, Germany
Kittlitz, Lübbenau, a quarter of the city of Lübbenau, Brandenburg, Germany
Kittlitz, Löbau, a quarter of the city of Löbau, Saxony, Germany
Kytlice (German: Kittlitz), a village and municipality (obec) in the Ústí nad Labem Region, Czech Republic

People
Heinrich von Kittlitz (1799-1874), German explorer and ornithologist